The 2007 Volleyball America's Cup was the sixth edition of the annual men's volleyball tournament, played by six countries from North, Central and South America. The tournament was held from August 15 to August 19, 2007 in Manaus, Brazil.

Squads

Main Round

Group A

Wednesday August 15

Thursday August 16

Friday August 17

Group B

Wednesday August 15

Thursday August 16

Friday August 17

Final round

Semi-finals
Saturday 2007-08-18

Finals
Saturday 2007-08-18 — Fifth Place Match

Sunday 2007-08-19 — Bronze Medal Match

Sunday 2007-08-19 — Gold Medal Match

Final ranking

Awards

Most Valuable Player

Best Spiker
 

Best Server
 

Best Blocker
 

Best Scorer
 

Best Digger
 

Best Setter

Best Receiver

References
 Sports123
 Results

Volleyball America's Cup
A
A
Volleyball